Tin Pan Alley was a collection of music publishers and songwriters in New York City that dominated the popular music of the United States in the late 19th and early 20th centuries. It originally referred to a specific place: West 28th Street between Fifth and Sixth Avenues in the Flower District of Manhattan; a plaque (see below) on the sidewalk on 28th Street between Broadway and Sixth commemorates it. 

In 2019, the New York City Landmarks Preservation Commission took up the question of preserving five buildings on the north side of the street as a Tin Pan Alley Historic District. The agency designated five buildings (47–55 West 28th Street) individual landmarks on December 10, 2019, after a concerted effort by the "Save Tin Pan Alley" initiative of the 29th Street Neighborhood Association.  Following successful protection of these landmarks, project director George Calderaro and other proponents formed the Tin Pan Alley American Popular Music Project to continue and commemorate the legacy of Tin Pan Alley with various advocacy and educational activities.  

On April 2, 2022, 28th Street between Broadway and 6th Avenue was officially co-named “Tin Pan Alley” by the City of New York in a celebration featuring NYC City Councilmember Erik Bottcher, Manhattan Borough President Mark Levine and representatives from the NYC Landmarks Preservation Commission, the Flatiron/Nomad Partnership and the Tin Pan Alley American Popular Music Project which advocated for the co-naming.

The start of Tin Pan Alley is usually dated to about 1885, when a number of music publishers set up shop in the same district of Manhattan. The end of Tin Pan Alley is less clear cut. Some date it to the start of the Great Depression in the 1930s when the phonograph, radio, and motion pictures supplanted sheet music as the driving force of American popular music, while others consider Tin Pan Alley to have continued into the 1950s when earlier styles of music were upstaged by the rise of rock & roll, which was centered on the Brill Building. Brill Building songwriter Neil Sedaka described his employer as being a natural outgrowth of Tin Pan Alley, in that the older songwriters were still employed in Tin Pan Alley firms while younger songwriters such as Sedaka found work at the Brill Building.

Origin of the name
Various explanations have been advanced to account for the origins of the term "Tin Pan Alley". The most popular account holds that it was originally a derogatory reference by Monroe H. Rosenfeld in the New York Herald to the collective sound made by many "cheap upright pianos" all playing different tunes being reminiscent of the banging of tin pans in an alleyway. However, no article by Rosenfeld that uses the term has been found.

Simon Napier-Bell quotes an account of the origin of the name published in a 1930 book about the music business. In this version, popular songwriter Harry von Tilzer was being interviewed about the area around 28th Street and Fifth Avenue, where many music publishers had offices. Von Tilzer had modified his expensive Kindler & Collins piano by placing strips of paper down the strings to give the instrument a more percussive sound. The journalist told von Tilzer, "Your Kindler & Collins sounds exactly like a tin can. I'll call the article 'Tin Pan Alley'." In any case, the name was firmly attached by the fall of 1908, when The Hampton Magazine published an article titled "Tin Pan Alley" about 28th Street.

According to the Online Etymology Dictionary, "tin pan" was slang for "a decrepit piano" (1882), and the term came to mean a "hit song writing business" by 1907.

With time, the nickname came to describe the American music publishing industry in general. The term then spread to the United Kingdom, where "Tin Pan Alley" is also used to describe Denmark Street in London's West End. In the 1920s the street became known as "Britain's Tin Pan Alley" because of its large number of music shops.

Origin of song publishing in New York City
In the mid-19th century, copyright control of melodies was not as strict, and publishers would often print their own versions of the songs popular at the time. With stronger copyright protection laws late in the century, songwriters, composers, lyricists, and publishers started working together for their mutual financial benefit. Songwriters would literally bang on the doors of Tin Pan Alley businesses to get new material.

The commercial center of the popular music publishing industry changed during the course of the 19th century, starting in Boston and moving to Philadelphia, Chicago and Cincinnati before settling in New York City under the influence of new and vigorous publishers which concentrated on vocal music. The two most enterprising New York publishers were Willis Woodard and T.B. Harms, the first companies to specialize in popular songs rather than hymns or classical music. Naturally, these firms were located in the entertainment district, which, at the time, was centered on Union Square. Witmark was the first publishing house to move to West 28th Street as the entertainment district gradually shifted uptown, and by the late 1890s most publishers had followed their lead.

The biggest music houses established themselves in New York City, but small local publishers – often connected with commercial printers or music stores – continued to flourish throughout the country, and there were important regional music publishing centers in Chicago, New Orleans, St. Louis, and Boston. When a tune became a significant local hit, rights to it were usually purchased from the local publisher by one of the big New York firms.

In its prime

The song publishers who created Tin Pan Alley frequently had backgrounds as salesmen. Isadore Witmark previously sold water filters and Leo Feist had sold corsets. Joe Stern and Edward B. Marks had sold neckties and buttons, respectively. The music houses in lower Manhattan were lively places, with a steady stream of songwriters, vaudeville and Broadway performers, musicians, and "song pluggers" coming and going.

Aspiring songwriters came to demonstrate tunes they hoped to sell. When tunes were purchased from unknowns with no previous hits, the name of someone with the firm was often added as co-composer (in order to keep a higher percentage of royalties within the firm), or all rights to the song were purchased outright for a flat fee (including rights to put someone else's name on the sheet music as the composer). An extraordinary number of Jewish East European immigrants became the music publishers and songwriters on Tin Pan Alley – the most famous being Irving Berlin. Songwriters who became established producers of successful songs were hired to be on the staff of the music houses.

"Song pluggers" were pianists and singers who represented the music publishers, making their living demonstrating songs to promote sales of sheet music. Most music stores had song pluggers on staff. Other pluggers were employed by the publishers to travel and familiarize the public with their new publications. Among the ranks of song pluggers were George Gershwin, Harry Warren, Vincent Youmans and Al Sherman. A more aggressive form of song plugging was known as "booming": it meant buying dozens of tickets for shows, infiltrating the audience and then singing the song to be plugged. At Shapiro Bernstein, Louis Bernstein recalled taking his plugging crew to cycle races at Madison Square Garden: "They had 20,000 people there, we had a pianist and a singer with a large horn. We'd sing a song to them thirty times a night. They'd cheer and yell, and we kept pounding away at them. When people walked out, they'd be singing the song. They couldn't help it."

When vaudeville performers played New York City, they would often visit various Tin Pan Alley firms to find new songs for their acts. Second- and third-rate performers often paid for rights to use a new song, while famous stars were given free copies of publisher's new numbers or were paid to perform them, the publishers knowing this was valuable advertising.

Initially Tin Pan Alley specialized in melodramatic ballads and comic novelty songs, but it embraced the newly popular styles of the cakewalk and ragtime music. Later, jazz and blues were incorporated, although less completely, as Tin Pan Alley was oriented towards producing songs that amateur singers or small town bands could perform from printed music. In the 1910s and 1920s Tin Pan Alley published pop songs and dance numbers created in newly popular jazz and blues styles.

Influence on law and business
A group of Tin Pan Alley music houses formed the Music Publishers Association of the United States on June 11, 1895, and unsuccessfully lobbied the federal government in favor of the Treloar Copyright Bill, which would have changed the term of copyright for published music from 24 to 40 years, renewable for an additional 20 instead of 14 years. The bill, if enacted, would also have included music among the subject matter covered by the Manufacturing clause of the International Copyright Act of 1891.

The American Society of Composers, Authors, and Publishers (ASCAP) was founded in 1914 to aid and protect the interests of established publishers and composers. New members were only admitted with sponsorship of existing members.

The term and established business methodologies associated with Tin Pan Alley persisted into the 1960s when innovative artists like Bob Dylan helped establish new norms. Referring to the dominant conventions of music publishers of the early 20th century, "Tin Pan Alley is gone," Bob Dylan proclaimed in 1985, "I put an end to it. People can record their own songs now."

Contributions to World War II
During the Second World War, Tin Pan Alley and the federal government teamed up to produce a war song that would inspire the American public to support the fight against the Axis, something they both "seemed to believe ... was vital to the war effort". The Office of War Information was in charge of this project, and believed that Tin Pan Alley contained "a reservoir of talent and competence capable of influencing people's feelings and opinions" that it "might be capable of even greater influence during wartime than that of George M. Cohan's 'Over There' during World War I." In the United States, the song "Over There" has been said to be the most popular and resonant patriotic song associated with World War I. Due to the large fan base of Tin Pan Alley, the government believed that this sector of the music business would be far-reaching in spreading patriotic sentiments.

In the United States Congress, congressmen quarreled over a proposal to exempt musicians and other entertainers from the draft in order to remain in the country to boost morale. Stateside, these artists and performers were continuously using available media to promote the war effort and to demonstrate a commitment to victory. However, the proposal was contested by those who strongly believed that only those who provided more substantial contributions to the war effort should benefit from any draft legislation.

As the war progressed, those in charge of writing the would-be national war song began to understand that the interest of the public lay elsewhere. Since the music would take up such a large amount of airtime, it was imperative that the writing be consistent with the war message that the radio was carrying throughout the nation. In her book, God Bless America: Tin Pan Alley Goes to War, Kathleen E. R. Smith writes that "escapism seemed to be a high priority for music listeners", leading "the composers of Tin Pan Alley [to struggle] to write a war song that would appeal both to civilians and the armed forces". By the end of the war, no such song had been produced that could rival hits like "Over There" from World War I.

Whether or not the number of songs circulated from Tin Pan Alley between 1939 and 1945 was greater than during the First World War is still debated. In his book The Songs That Fought the War: Popular Music and the Home Front, John Bush Jones cites Jeffrey C. Livingstone as claiming that Tin Pan Alley released more songs during World War I than it did in World War II. Jones, on the other hand, argues that "there is also strong documentary evidence that the output of American war-related songs during World War II was most probably unsurpassed in any other war".

Composers and lyricists
Leading Tin Pan Alley composers and lyricists include:

Milton Ager
Thomas S. Allen
Harold Arlen
Ernest Ball
Harry Barris
Irving Berlin
Bernard Bierman
George Botsford
Shelton Brooks
Lew Brown
Nacio Herb Brown
Irving Caesar
Sammy Cahn
Hoagy Carmichael
George M. Cohan
Con Conrad
J. Fred Coots
Gussie Lord Davis
Buddy DeSylva
Walter Donaldson
Paul Dresser
Dave Dreyer
Al Dubin
Vernon Duke
Dorothy Fields
Ted Fio Rito
Max Freedman
Cliff Friend
George Gershwin
Ira Gershwin
Oscar Hammerstein II
E. Y. "Yip" Harburg
Charles K. Harris
Lorenz Hart
Ray Henderson
James P. Johnson
Isham Jones
Scott Joplin
Gus Kahn
Bert Kalmar
Jerome Kern
Ted Koehler
Al Lewis
Sam M. Lewis
Frank Loesser
Jimmy McHugh
F. W. Meacham
Johnny Mercer
Halsey K. Mohr
Theodora Morse
Ethelbert Nevin
 Mitchell Parish
Bernice Petkere
Maceo Pinkard
Lew Pollack
Cole Porter
Andy Razaf
Richard Rodgers
Harry Ruby
Al Sherman
Lou Singer
Sunny Skylar
Ted Snyder
Kay Swift
Edward Teschemacher
Albert Von Tilzer
Harry Von Tilzer
Fats Waller
Harry Warren
Richard A. Whiting
Harry M. Woods
Allie Wrubel
Jack Yellen
Vincent Youmans
Joe Young
Hy Zaret

Notable hit songs
Tin Pan Alley's biggest hits included:

"A Bird in a Gilded Cage" (Harry Von Tilzer, 1900)
"After the Ball" (Charles K. Harris, 1892)
"Ain't She Sweet" (Jack Yellen and Milton Ager, 1927)
"Alabama Jubilee" (Jack Yellen and George L. Cobb, 1915)
"Alexander's Ragtime Band" (Irving Berlin, 1911)
"All Alone" (Irving Berlin, 1924)
"At a Georgia Campmeeting" (Kerry Mills, 1897)
"Baby Face" (Benny Davis and Harry Akst, 1926)
"Bill Bailey, Won't You Please Come Home" (Huey Cannon, 1902)
"By the Light of the Silvery Moon" (Gus Edwards and Edward Madden, 1909)
"Carolina in the Morning" (Gus Kahn and Walter Donaldson, 1922)
"Come Josephine in My Flying Machine" (Fred Fisher and Alfred Bryan, 1910)
"Down by the Old Mill Stream" (Tell Taylor, 1910)
"Everybody Loves My Baby" (Spencer Williams, 1924)
"For Sentimental Reasons" (Al Sherman, Abner Silver and Edward Heyman, 1936)
"Give My Regards to Broadway" (George M. Cohan, 1904)
"God Bless America" (Irving Berlin, 1918; revised 1938)
"Happy Days Are Here Again" (Jack Yellen and Milton Ager, 1930)
"Hearts and Flowers" (Theodore Moses Tobani, 1899)
"Hello Ma Baby (Hello Ma Ragtime Gal)" (Emerson, Howard, and Sterling, 1899)
"I Cried for You" (Arthur Freed and Nacio Herb Brown, 1923)
"I'm Forever Blowing Bubbles" (John Kellette, 1919)
"In the Baggage Coach Ahead" (Gussie L. Davis, 1896)
"In the Good Old Summer Time" (Ren Shields and George Evans, 1902)
"In the Shade of the Old Apple Tree" (Harry Williams and Egbert van Alstyne, 1905)
"K-K-K-Katy" (Geoffrey O'Hara, 1918)
"Let Me Call You Sweetheart" (Beth Slater Whitson and Leo Friedman, 1910)
"Lindbergh (The Eagle of the U.S.A.)" (Al Sherman and Howard Johnson, 1927)
"Lovesick Blues" (Cliff Friend and Irving Mills, 1922)
"Mighty Lak' a Rose" (Ethelbert Nevin & Frank L. Stanton, 1901)
"Mister Johnson, Turn Me Loose" (Ben Harney, 1896)
"My Blue Heaven" (Walter Donaldson and George Whiting, 1927)
"Now's the Time to Fall in Love" (Al Sherman and Al Lewis, 1931)
"Oh, Donna Clara" (Irving Caesar, 1928)
"Oh by Jingo!" (Albert Von Tilzer, 1919)
"On the Banks of the Wabash, Far Away" (Paul Dresser 1897)
"Over There" (George M. Cohan, 1917)
"Peg o' My Heart" (Fred Fisher and Alfred Bryan, 1913)
"Shine Little Glow Worm" (Paul Lincke and Lilla Cayley Robinson, 1907)
"Shine on Harvest Moon" (Nora Bayes and Jack Norworth, 1908)
"Some of These Days" (Shelton Brooks, 1911)
"Stardust" (Hoagy Carmichael and Mitchell Parish, 1927)
"Swanee" (George Gershwin, 1919)
"Sweet Georgia Brown" (Maceo Pinkard, 1925)
"Take Me Out to the Ball Game" (Albert Von Tilzer, 1908)
"The Band Played On" (Charles B. Ward and John F. Palmer, 1895)
"The Darktown Strutters' Ball" (Shelton Brooks, 1917)
"The Little Lost Child" (Marks and Stern, 1894)
"The Man Who Broke the Bank at Monte Carlo" (Charles Coborn, 1892)
"The Sidewalks of New York" (Lawlor and Blake, 1894)
"The Japanese Sandman" (1920)
"There'll Be a Hot Time in the Old Town Tonight" (Joe Hayden and Theodore Mertz, 1896)
"Warmest Baby in the Bunch" (George M. Cohan, 1896)
"Way Down Yonder in New Orleans" (Creamer and Turner Layton, 1922)
"Whispering" (1920)
"Yes, We Have No Bananas" (Frank Silver and Irving Cohn, 1923)
"You Gotta Be a Football Hero" (Al Sherman, Buddy Fields and Al Lewis, 1933)

In popular culture
The Bob Geddins blues song "Tin Pan Alley (aka The Roughest Place in Town)", recorded by Jimmy Wilson, was a top 10 hit on the R&B chart in 1953 and became a popular song among West Coast blues performers. The song was also covered by Stevie Ray Vaughan.
In the 1970s to early 1980s, a Times Square bar named Tin Pan Alley, its owners, Steve d'Agroso and Maggie Smith, and many of its patrons were the real-life inspiration for the HBO series The Deuce. The bar was renamed The Hi-Hat in the series.
The song "Who Are You" by The Who has the stanza "I stretched back and I hiccupped / And looked back on my busy day / Eleven hours in the Tin Pan / God, there's got to be another way", which references a long legal meeting with music publisher Allen Klein.

See also
Brill Building
Music Row
Printer's Alley
Radio Row
The Tin Pan Alley Rag

References
Notes

Bibliography
Bloom, Ken. The American Songbook: The Singers, the Songwriters, and the Songs. New York: Black Dog and Leventhal, 2005.  
Charlton, Katherine (2011). Rock music style: a history. New York: McGraw Hill.
Forte, Allen. Listening to Classic American Popular Songs. New Haven: Yale University Press, 2001.
.
.
Goldberg, Isaac. Tin Pan Alley, A Chronicle of American Music. New York: Frederick Ungar, [1930], 1961.
Hajduk, John C. "Tin Pan Alley on the March: Popular Music, World War II, and the Quest for a Great War Song." Popular Music and Society 26.4 (2003): 497–512.
Hamm, Charles. Music in the New World. New York: Norton, 1983. 
Jasen, David A. Tin Pan Alley: The Composers, the Songs, the Performers and Their Times. New York: Donald I. Fine, Primus, 1988.  
Jasen, David A., and Gene Jones. Spreadin’ Rhythm Around: Black Popular Songwriters, 1880–1930. New York: Schirmer Books, 1998.

Marks, Edward B., as told to Abbott J. Liebling. They All Sang: From Tony Pastor to Rudy Vallée. New York: Viking Press, 1934.
Morath, Max. The NPR Curious Listener’s Guide to Popular Standards. New York: Penguin Putnam, Berkley Publishing, a Perigree Book, 2002. 

Sanjek, Russell. American Popular Music and Its Business: The First Four Hundred Years, Volume III, From 1900 to 1984. New York: Oxford University Press, 1988.
Sanjek, Russell. From Print to Plastic: Publishing and Promoting America’s Popular Music, 1900–1980. I.S.A.M. Monographs: Number 20. Brooklyn: Institute for Studies in American Music, Conservatory of Music, Brooklyn College, City University of New York, 1983.
Smith, Kathleen E. R. God Bless America: Tin Pan Alley Goes to War. Lexington, Ky: University Press of Kentucky, 2003.  
Tawa, Nicholas E. The Way to Tin Pan Alley: American Popular Song, 1866–1910. New York: Schirmer Books, 1990. 
Whitcomb, Ian After the Ball: Pop Music from Rag to Rock. New York: Proscenium Publishers, 1986, reprint of Penguin Press, 1972.  
Wilder, Alec. American Popular Song: The Great Innovators, 1900–1950. London: Oxford University Press, 1972.
Zinsser, William. Easy to Remember: The Great American Songwriters and Their Songs. Jaffrey, NH: David R. Godine, 2000.  

Further reading
 Scheurer, Timothy E., American Popular Music: The nineteenth century and Tin Pan Alley, Bowling Green State University, Popular Press, 1989 (Volume I)
 Scheurer, Timothy E., American Popular Music: The age of rock, Bowling Green State University, Popular Press, 1989 (Volume II)

External links

Tin Pan Alley American Popular Music Project
Parlor Songs: History of Tin Pan Alley

American styles of music
Music organizations based in the United States
Music of New York City
Cultural history of New York City
Popular music
Vaudeville tropes
20th century in New York City